Disc coral may refer to several different taxa:

 species of the genus Cycloseris
 species of the genus Ctenactis
 species of the genus Fungia
 species of the genus Turbinaria (coral)
 Montipora capricornis, a species of coral

Set index articles on corals